Nilobezzia is a genus of biting midges in the family Ceratopogonidae. There are more than 70 described species in Nilobezzia.

Species
These 78 species belong to the genus Nilobezzia:

 Nilobezzia acanthopus (de Meijere, 1907)
 Nilobezzia alipennis Kieffer, 1911
 Nilobezzia allotropica Kieffer, 1913
 Nilobezzia aranea Debenham, 1974
 Nilobezzia arcuatipes Kieffer, 1913
 Nilobezzia armata Kieffer, 1921
 Nilobezzia ateles (Macfie, 1940)
 Nilobezzia atoporna Yu & Zhang, 1997
 Nilobezzia badia Johannsen, 1931
 Nilobezzia bakeri (Kieffer, 1921)
 Nilobezzia basispinigera Debenham, 1974
 Nilobezzia belligera (Meillon, 1940)
 Nilobezzia borneana (Macfie, 1934)
 Nilobezzia brevicornis (Wirth, 1952)
 Nilobezzia brevipalpis (Kieffer, 1924)
 Nilobezzia claripennia (Kieffer, 1912)
 Nilobezzia claripennis (Kieffer, 1916)
 Nilobezzia conjuncta Kieffer, 1916
 Nilobezzia connexa Kieffer, 1916
 Nilobezzia conspicua (Johannsen, 1931)
 Nilobezzia curticornis (Kieffer, 1917)
 Nilobezzia diffidens (Johannsen, 1931)
 Nilobezzia discolor (de Meijere, 1907)
 Nilobezzia disjuncta (Kieffer, 1913)
 Nilobezzia disticta (Kieffer, 1911)
 Nilobezzia duodenalis Liu, Ge & Liu, 1996
 Nilobezzia fijiensis Wirth & Giles, 1990
 Nilobezzia flavida Remm, 1980
 Nilobezzia flaviventris (Kieffer, 1910)
 Nilobezzia formosa (Loew, 1869)
 Nilobezzia formosana (Kieffer, 1912)
 Nilobezzia fusca Kieffer, 1921
 Nilobezzia fuscitarsis Debenham, 1974
 Nilobezzia hamifera (Kieffer, 1913)
 Nilobezzia henanei Clastrier, 1962
 Nilobezzia hunyani Meillon, 1943
 Nilobezzia inermipes (Kieffer, 1916)
 Nilobezzia insons Johannsen, 1931
 Nilobezzia japana (Tokunaga, 1939)
 Nilobezzia javanensis Macfie, 1934
 Nilobezzia kerteszi (Kieffer, 1916)
 Nilobezzia lacteipennis (Kieffer, 1910)
 Nilobezzia leucothrix Remm, 1980
 Nilobezzia maai Tokunaga, 1966
 Nilobezzia mallochi Wirth, 1962
 Nilobezzia manicata Clastrier, 1958
 Nilobezzia minor (Wirth, 1952)
 Nilobezzia myrmedon (Kieffer, 1921)
 Nilobezzia neotropica (Macfie, 1940)
 Nilobezzia nigra Sen & Gupta, 1958
 Nilobezzia nigricans (Kieffer, 1910)
 Nilobezzia nigritibialis (Ingram & Macfie, 1921)
 Nilobezzia nigriventris (Kieffer, 1924)
 Nilobezzia nilotica (Kieffer, 1924)
 Nilobezzia nipponensis (Tokunaga, 1939)
 Nilobezzia ochriventris Edwards, 1929
 Nilobezzia paraensis (Lane, 1958)
 Nilobezzia photophila (Kieffer, 1913)
 Nilobezzia pictipes (Kieffer, 1910)
 Nilobezzia posticata (Zetterstedt, 1850)
 Nilobezzia punctipes Macfie, 1934
 Nilobezzia raphaelis Salm, 1918
 Nilobezzia robusta (Meillon, 1937)
 Nilobezzia schwarzii (Coquillett, 1901)
 Nilobezzia scotti (Kieffer, 1911)
 Nilobezzia semirufa (Kieffer, 1921)
 Nilobezzia setipes Coquillett
 Nilobezzia setoensis (Tokunaga, 1939)
 Nilobezzia simplicior Debenham, 1974
 Nilobezzia spinifera (Kieffer, 1916)
 Nilobezzia stictonota Kieffer, 1911
 Nilobezzia subtilicrinus Debenham, 1974
 Nilobezzia tetrasticta (Kieffer, 1911)
 Nilobezzia vaga (Kieffer, 1911)
 Nilobezzia virago Debenham, 1974
 Nilobezzia whartoni Lee, 1948
 Nilobezzia yasumatsui Wirth & Ratanaworabhan, 1981
 Nilobezzia zibanensis Clastrier, 1962

References

Further reading

 
 
 

Ceratopogonidae
Articles created by Qbugbot
Chironomoidea genera